Robert King (1848 - 20 February 1905) was a member of the Queensland Legislative Assembly.

Biography
King was born in County Antrim, Ireland, the son of Charles King and his wife Mary (née McCuray). He received his education in Ireland and after arriving in Australia acquired the Court House Hotel in Roma in 1884. He worked in Brisbane from 1895 but in 1904 returned to Roma to become the licensee of the Court House Hotel again.

He married Jane Ann Lanaler (died 1947) in Tamworth and together had 3 sons and four daughters. He died at Roma in February 1905 and was buried in the South Brisbane Cemetery.

Public career
Kennedy was the Labour member for Maranoa in the Queensland Legislative Assembly from 1893 until 1899.

References

Members of the Queensland Legislative Assembly
1848 births
1905 deaths
Australian Labor Party members of the Parliament of Queensland
19th-century Australian politicians